The River Kird is a river located in the Chichester District of West Sussex, England that is a tributary to the River Arun. It is located in South Downs National Park.

Course 

Located entirely in the Chichester District of West Sussex, England, the river rises in the western Weald – an area of undulating countryside – north of Kirdford, and flows south-east until it reaches Kirdford, at which point it flows eastwards; in Wisborough Green, the river receives the waters of Boxal Brook then resumes its south-easterly course before flowing into the River Arun.

Flora and fauna 
The river lies in the western Weald, an area of undulating countryside containing a mixture of woodland and heathland areas. A 2017 study by Dr. Alison Barker FRES recorded eight species of damselfly and eleven species of dragonfly that inhabited the river.

Pollution 
In December 2013, a high level of ammonia pollution was found in the river by Kirkford, which was deadly to the river's fish. In September 2016, a dairy farm was ordered to pay an £8,000 fine for letting effluent pollute a  stretch of the river.

References

External links 

Rivers of West Sussex